Carl Kline may refer to:

 Carl Kline (psychiatrist) (1915–2005), Canadian psychiatrist and researcher
 Carl Kline (White House official), United States White House official